The Education Resources Information Center (ERIC) is an online digital library of education research and information. ERIC is sponsored by the Institute of Education Sciences of the United States Department of Education.

Description
The mission of ERIC is to provide a comprehensive, easy-to-use, searchable, Internet-based bibliographic and full-text database of education research and information for educators, researchers, and the general public. Education research and information are essential to improving teaching, learning, and educational decision-making.

ERIC provides access to 1.5 million bibliographic records (citations, abstracts, and other pertinent data) of journal articles and other education-related materials, with hundreds of new records added every week. A key component of ERIC is its collection of grey literature in education, which is largely available in full text in Adobe PDF format. Approximately one quarter of the complete ERIC Collection is available in full text. Materials with no full text available (primarily journal articles) can often be accessed using links to publisher websites and/or library holdings. ERIC usually includes education related articles in its database. Sample articles include "The Economic, Social and Administrative Pharmacy (ESAP) Discipline in US Schools and Colleges of Pharmacy", "Aesthetics in Young Children's Lives: From Music Technology Curriculum Perspective", and "Digital Game's Impacts on Students' Learning Effectiveness of Correct Medication".

The ERIC Collection, begun in 1966, contains records for a variety of publication types, including: 
journal articles
books
research syntheses
conference papers
technical reports
dissertations
policy papers, and
other education-related materials

ERIC provides the public with a centralized Web site for searching the ERIC collection and submitting materials to be considered for inclusion in the collection. Users can also access the collection through commercial database vendors, statewide and institutional networks, and Internet search engines. To help users find the information they are seeking, ERIC produces a controlled vocabulary, the Thesaurus of ERIC Descriptors. This is a carefully selected list of education-related words and phrases used to tag materials by subject and make them easier to retrieve through a search.

Prior to January 2004, the ERIC network consisted of sixteen subject-specific clearinghouses, various adjunct and affiliate clearinghouses, and three support components. The program was consolidated into a single entity, with upgraded systems, and paper-based processes converted to electronic, thus streamlining operations and speeding delivery of content.

See also 
List of academic databases and search engines

References

External links 
 
 ERIC Digests, a repository for materials produced by the former ERIC Clearinghouse system up to 2003

Educational research
Educational materials
United States Department of Education
Government-owned websites of the United States
Government databases in the United States
Public domain databases
Bibliographic databases and indexes
Full-text scholarly online databases
American digital libraries
Discipline-oriented digital libraries
Aggregation-based digital libraries